Susan Kathryn Youssef  (born 1984) is a writer and actor who works in television, on radio and stage in Australia and the United Kingdom. Youssef performed at the Melbourne International Comedy Festival, Sydney Comedy Festival, Edinburgh Festival Fringe, and Homebake.

Youssef is best known for her appearances in the television series The Project, Whose Line Is It Anyway? Australia, How Not to Behave,  No Activity and  Rosehaven. She has twice used her family name in the title of her stand-up comedy shows.

Career
Youssef began comedy writing in high school where she wrote her own plays. She began studying education, to become a teacher. A friend took her to an improvisational comedy show at Newtown's Enmore Theatre, which sparked a more serious interest in comedy. She quit college and Youssef attended iO Chicago where she studied improvisational performance and comedy.

Youssef began her comedy career as a writer for The Ronnie Johns Half Hour in 2006, and made her acting debut in the short film Clicked in the role of Lina in 2011. In 2014, she played Jane in the short film Kevin Needs to Make New Friends: Because Everyone Hates Him for Some Reason and then turned to television where she appeared in The Chaser's Media Circus.
In 2014, Youssef played the lead role of Sarah in the Hayloft Project’s stage play The Boat People which won the Best On Stage award at the FBi SMAC Awards in 2014.

Youssef started performing improvisational comedy live. She made her solo debut in her sketch comedy show Sketchual Chocolate at the Melbourne and Sydney Comedy Festivals. In 2015, she returned to the comedy festival circuit with her comedy show Owl Eyes On You and in 2016 made her debut in London and at the Edinburgh Fringe with her stand-up show Check Youssef Before You Wreck Youssef. She is part of the Improv Theatre Sydney ensemble. 

In 2015, Youssef appeared in other television series including Community Kitchen, About Tonight, The Checkout and Game Night. Yousseff had recurring roles in the television comedy series How Not to Behave, Whose Line Is It Anyway? Australia, No Activity and  Rosehaven, and a guest role in Here Come the Habibs in 2016.
In 2017, Youssef toured with her comedy show Behave Youssef. She has also been a guest on The Project, All Star Family Feud, Celebrity Name Game, Have You Been Paying Attention? and Hughesy, We Have a Problem.

In 2020, Youssef was confirmed as one of ten Australian comedians to compete for $100,000 on the experimental reality television series Last One Laughing Australia hosted by Rebel Wilson and screening on Amazon Prime in June.

Live Stand-up Comedy Tours

Filmography

Stage

Hosting
In 2017, Youssef hosted season two of the comedy TV series Stand and Deliver on digital TV channel ABC ME, which featured comedic acts from Australia and overseas.

Personal life
Youssef is a descendant of Lebanese immigrants. She grew up with five sisters and she often uses her family for comedy inspiration.

References

External links
Susie Youssef’s Bio
 
Susie Youssef’s biography at Creative Representation

Australian women comedians
Comedians from Sydney
Australian stand-up comedians
Living people
1984 births
Australian people of Lebanese descent